Sardauna Local Government Area is located in the extreme southeast of Taraba State in Nigeria. It sits atop the Mambilla Plateau, which is dotted by other towns such as Maisamari and Nguroje. The capital of the LGA is Gembu, which is the principal town of various ethnic groups, such as Mambilla, Kaka, Fulani, Ndola, Tigon,  Kambu, Chamba and Panso. Other ethnic groups from the mainstream Nigeria and the bordering Cameroon republic such as Hausa and Kanuri also live there.

Climate
In contrast to the rather steamy and humid climate of most other parts of southeastern Nigeria, the climate in this part of the country (owing to its altitude) is relatively cool; most days in the dry season the temperature will reach 20-23 C and drop to 16-18 C at night, whilst in the wet season these averages fall a couple of degrees.

Languages
Sardauna is highly linguistically diverse, with about two dozen distinct local languages (mostly Fulani languages, Jukunoid languages, Bantoid languages, and Mambiloid languages).
Fulani language
Ambo language
Áncá language
Batu language
Buru language
Etkywan language
Fum language
Kpan language
Lamnso’ language
Lidzonka language
Limbum language
Mambila language
Tigon Mbembe language
Mbongno language
Mvanip language
Nde-Gbite language
Ndoola language
Ndunda language
Nshi language
Somyev language
Viti language
Vute language
Yamba language

References

Local Government Areas in Taraba State